Albert Matignon (11 June 1860 – 17 June 1937) was a French painter. His work was part of the painting event in the art competition at the 1932 Summer Olympics.

References

External links
 

1860 births
1937 deaths
20th-century French painters
20th-century French male artists
French male painters
Olympic competitors in art competitions
People from Sablé-sur-Sarthe